The In-Laws is a 1979 American action comedy film starring Alan Arkin and Peter Falk, written by Andrew Bergman and directed by Arthur Hiller on various locations, including Mexico, which served as the film's representation of the fictional Central American setting. A remake was made in 2003.

Plot
The daughter of mild-mannered Manhattan dentist Sheldon "Shelly" Kornpett and the son of businessman Vince Ricardo are engaged to be married. At an introductory dinner in which Shelly meets his new in-law Vince, he finds Vince suspicious; during the dinner, Vince tells a crazy story of a nine-month "consulting" trip to 1954 Guatemala. Vince's son and wife seem oblivious. At one point in the dinner Vince excuses himself to make a phone call, and hides something in the basement. Later that night, Shelly pleads with his daughter not to marry into the Ricardo clan, since he mistrusts Vince, but he is talked into giving the marriage a chance.

The following day, Vince appears at Sheldon's office, claiming that he wanted to say hello. He asks Shelly for help with a five-minute errand: breaking into Vince's office safe. Shelly reluctantly agrees. After retrieving a mysterious black bag from Vince's cramped office in an old Herald Square office building, two armed hit men surprise Sheldon. After a chase and shootout, Vince explains to the frightened Shelly he has worked for the CIA since the Eisenhower administration and robbed the United States Mint of engraving plates to crack a worldwide inflation plot hatched in Central America. He mentions he robbed the U.S. Mint on his own; the CIA had turned him down, deeming the caper too risky. Vince claims that Sheldon is not involved; however, if Vince is caught, he will be jailed for 20 years and fired from the CIA. Vince further upsets Sheldon by mentioning he left an engraving plate in the basement of Sheldon's house the previous night.

During the wedding preparations, Mrs. Kornpett discovers the engraving and brings it to her local bank, where she is informed by the U.S. Treasury Department that it was stolen. Sheldon arrives home to find Treasury officials there and speeds out of the driveway, leading to a car chase through suburban New Jersey. Sheldon calls Vince and explains what happened; Vince tells Sheldon he wants him to accompany him to Scranton, Pennsylvania, and the whole ordeal will be cleared up by the time they return. At a small airport near Lodi, New Jersey, Vince and Sheldon board a jet.

To Shelly's consternation, during the flight he notices they are flying over the Atlantic Ocean. Vince assures Sheldon they are still going to Scranton, but  they need to make a brief stop along the way in Tijata, a small island south of Honduras. When they arrive, Vince is supposed to meet a corrupt member of the small country's legislature, General Jesus Braunschweiger. When they land, Jesus is shot and killed before he can greet and debrief the two. Vince and Sheldon fall under sniper fire and, using the General's car, escape and drive into town. At their hotel, Vince contacts the mastermind of the inflation plot, General Garcia.

Sheldon, tired of the ordeal, refuses to be shot at any more; unknown to Vince, he calls the United States Embassy and is told by the CIA agent-in-charge that Vince is a madman who was mentally discharged from the agency. Sheldon tells this to Vince, who prevents him from escaping, assuring Sheldon that the embassy told him that to get Shelly off the trail. Sheldon is still reluctant.

Leaving the hotel, Vince hails a taxi driven by one of the airport snipers. Sheldon chases, leaping onto the roof of the car. Vince takes control of the car, crashing into a fruit market. Grateful to Sheldon for saving him (and after another shootout and car chase), Vince and Shelly reach the General's estate. The insane general gives them $20 million for the plates, awards them medals, and marches them in front of a firing squad. Vince stalls for time until hundreds of CIA agents, led by Barry Lutz, overwhelm the army and take Garcia into custody. Lutz reveals that Vince was telling the truth the entire time; however, Vince retires, as he has had enough. He gives Lutz the $10 million he had agreed to deliver from the general. Vince and Sheldon take off with five million dollars each, giving their children a wedding gift of a million dollars to each.

Cast

In addition, conductor-composer Carmen Dragon makes a cameo appearance.

Production
Andrew Bergman says the film began when Warner Bros. approached him saying Alan Arkin and Peter Falk wanted to do a movie together. Bergman said:
I thought immediately, ‘Didn’t they do a movie?’ It’s like, they seemed so perfect for each other! Their personalities, you have a rabbit and a tortoise. You get a hysteric, a person who seems to have no feelings whatsoever ... and I hate constructing plots, hate it more than anything, but I love constructing characters, and this was the perfect thing where the characters were the plot. Whatever Peter said to Alan, that was the plot ... Since my stories are always about people getting in way over their heads ... this movie was the perfect type for me.

Reception
On review aggregator Rotten Tomatoes, the film has an approval rating of 88% based on 24 reviews, with an average rating of 7.6/10. On Metacritic, the film received a score of 69 based on 10 reviews, indicating "generally favorable reviews".

The New York Times film critic Janet Maslin wrote, "Andrew Bergman has written one of those rare comedy scripts that escalates steadily and hilariously, without faltering or even having to strain for an ending. As for Mr. Arkin and Mr. Falk, it is theirs, and not their children's, match that has been made in heaven. The teaming of their characters—milquetoast meets entrepreneur—is reminiscent of 'The Producers'". Dale Pollock of Variety stated, "With 'The In-Laws,' Warner Bros. should have a first certifiable comedy hit of the summer. The Arthur Hiller-William Sackheim production brims over with laughs, but brand of screenwriter Andrew Bergman's humor (previously seen in 'Blazing Saddles') may be too wacky for mainstream audiences." Gene Siskel of the Chicago Tribune gave the film 2.5 stars out of 4 and wrote, "In a way I feel guilty about knocking 'The In-Laws.' It's an original comedy in a summer movie season full of remakes, sequels, and imitative ripoffs. But if the script had given us more dinner party madness and less slapstick, I might have laughed along with everyone else." Kevin Thomas of the Los Angeles Times called it "one of the funniest comedies of the year. This hilarious film, directed by Arthur Hiller and written expressly for Falk and Arkin by Andrew Bergman, wastes not a second in getting laughs." Gary Arnold of The Washington Post dismissed the film as "a heavy-handed, smugly cynical farce." David Ansen wrote in Newsweek, "What makes 'The In-Laws' so engaging is not simply the escalating madness of Andrew Bergman's story (such whimsy could easily grow tiresome), but the deadpan counterpoint supplied by the two stars, who navigate their way through mounting disasters with an air of hilariously unjustified rationality. Bergman's script was tailor-made for Falk and Arkin, and they make the most of it."

The CIA showed the film at the base theater at Camp Peary, its Virginia training facility for new recruits.

Remake
The film was remade in 2003.

References

External links
 
 
 
 
“Serpentine! Serpentine!” The Impeccable Madness of The In-Laws an essay by Stephen Winer at the Criterion Collection

1979 films
1970s action comedy films
1970s crime comedy films
American action comedy films
Warner Bros. films
Films about weddings
Films directed by Arthur Hiller
Films scored by John Morris
Films shot in New Jersey
Films set in North America
Films set in New York City
Films set in a fictional country
Films about the Central Intelligence Agency
1979 comedy films
Films with screenplays by Andrew Bergman
1970s English-language films
1970s American films